Je voudrais vous raconter (English: I Wanted To Tell You) is a French-Moroccan documentary film directed by Dalila Ennadre, released in 2005.

Synopsis 
The film tells the intertwined stories of Moroccan women of all walks of life after the passing of the Mudawana.

Awards and accolades 

 2007 : Tarifa Festival of African Cinema - Jury Prize

External links 

 Je voudrais vous raconter - MUBI

References 

2000s French-language films
2005 documentary films
Documentary films about human rights
Documentary films about women in Africa
Moroccan documentary films